Jane Bennett may refer to:

 Jane Bennett (artist) (born 1960), Australian painter
 Jane Bennett (academic)
 Jane Bennett (political theorist) (born 1957), American professor
 Jane Bennett, a character in the novel Pride and Prejudice